Charlotte Vanhove (10 September 1771 – 11 April 1860) was a French stage actress and playwright. She was active at the Comedie-Francaise from 1786. She is also known as a writer, and was the author of several plays and books.

Life 

Charlotte Vanhove was born in 1771 in The Hague, Dutch Republic.  She was the daughter of actor Charles-Joseph Vanhove and actress Adnree Coche.

Early career

Being the daughter of two stage actors, Charlotte was destined for the theater. At the age of fourteen, she began studying and working at the Comedie-Francaise in 1785. In that same year, she took her title role in the play Iphigenia by Jean Racine. A few years later, Charlotte married a violinist, but shortly after the wedding, Charlotte asked for and was granted a divorce.

During the Terror of Robespierre, Comedie-Francaise came in conflict with the government. On the night of 2 September 1793, Charlotte was arrested along with twelve other actors of the French Theater, all of which were suspected of being royalists.  She, along with the twelve other actors, were arrested on charges of suspicion shortly after their performance of Pamela on 1 August, which officials believed was seditious towards the Crown. Charlotte and the twelve other actors were kept at the Prison Saints-Pelagie. They were released five months later.

Post-Revolution career 

After her release, Charlotte continued to perform comedy. In 1798, she and her father began purchasing a large estates starting with the Malgouverne in Bruony, France. Next, the pair bought the Governance and its Park which was put up for sale by previous owner Ribbing Frederick. Soon after, Charlotte met Joseph Talma, one of the most famous stage actors of her time. At the time, Talma was married to dancer Julie Carreau. Even though Talma was famous, he had amassed a significant amount of debt which his wife, Julie, took on. After their meeting, Charlotte and Talma started to grow close until they official began a life together. Julie, who was alone, half-ruined, and disgraced, accepted a divorce.

Talma and Charlotte officially married in 1802. During their marriage, Talma began expensive renovations to the two estates which Charlotte had just bought with her father, renovations which he initially paid for. Not long after the wedding, Talma took on a mistress with whom he had three children. She died soon after the last child was born and Talma took a new mistress. Despite the financial assistance of Talma's close friend, Napoleon Bonaparte, his debts began to pile up. Charlotte then began to take charge of the households and soon asks for a divorce. When her request is denied, she leaves the theater and is able to recover a sizable portion of her money that Talma spent. Charlotte, with her recouped funds, moved into a small hotel where she was surrounded by gardens and friends.

She is described as a beautiful blonde who enjoyed painting, drawing, and the theater.

Later life 

Shortly after moving into the small hotel, Charlotte began to devoted her life to the arts once again. She started to paint and draw, but most of all she wrote. She is known for writing Edmonton and Juliette in 1820, The Castle of Valmire in 1821, The Venetian in 1822, The Guilty Bride in 1824 and The Theatrical Act in 1835. Still married by law, Charlotte and Talma had little contact even though she took care of his three children. She paid their expenses and when they were sent to the Fontenay-sous Bois, she paid for that too.

When Talma died in 1826, she married the Conte de Chalot and became Countess Vanhove. The Count, who was a lifelong close friend with whom she enjoyed long walks and conversation with, died soon after their marriage. Countess Vanhove spent the rest of her days going down the Champs-Élysées in her carriage and attending the theater often.

On 11 April 1860, Charlotte died at the age of 90 in a Parisian hotel in Saint-Germain-des-Pres.

Performances 

 1785: Britannicus by Jean Racine- Junie 
 1785: Eugenie of Pierre Beaumarchais- Eugenie
 1785: Iphigenie by Jean Racine- Iphigenie
 1785: Phaedra by Jean Racine- Aricie
 1786: The Cavalier Without Fear and Without Reproach by Jacques Marie Boutet- The eldest daughter
 1786: Apelles and Campaspe de Voiron- Campaspe
 1786: Virginia 
 1786: The Misanthrope by Molière- Elionte
 1787: The School of the Fathers by Pierre- Alexandre Pieyre- Mme de Courval 
 1787: Athalie by Jean Racine- Zacharie 
 1787: George Dandin by Molière- Angelique
 1787: Tartuffe by Molière- Mariane 
 1788: The Barber of Seville de Beaumarchais- Rosine
 1793: Pamela
 1795: The Arab Family- Odeide
 1797: Agamemnon by Népomucène Lemercier- Cassandre 
 1799: Mathilde by Jacques-Marie Boutet- Mathilde
 1799: The Guilty Mother by Beaumarchais- Countess Almaviva
 1799: Tartuffe by Molière- Elmire 
 1799: Abufar by Jean Francois Ducis- Selma
 1800: Camille-Camille
 1800: Montmorency- Anne
 1800: Orphis by Nepomucene Lemercier- Nais
 1800: Oscar Son of Ossian d'Antoine-Vincent Arnoult- Malvina
 1800: Othello- Hedelmone
 1800: Pinto- Duchess of Baraganca
 1801: Faedor and Wladamir- Arzeline
 1801: Henry VIII- Anne Boulen 
 1801: Andromaque- Andromaque 
 1802: Bajazet- Atalide
 1802: Isle and Orovese by Nepomucene Lemercier- Isule
 1802: The King and the Laborer- Felicie 
 1803: The Curious- Siri Brahe
 1803: The Misanthrope- Celimene
 1804: Shakespeare in Love- Clarence
 1804: Peter the Great- Catherine
 1805: Amelie Mansfield- Amelie
 1805: The Domestic Tyrant- Mme Vilmont
 1806: The Youth of Henry V- Lady Clara
 1806: The False Samnanblues- Orphise
 1807: Theodore Abduction Projects Bread- Araminte
 1807: The Marriage by Figara de Beaumarchais- The Countess
 1808: Man of Convenience by Etieme do Jouy- Mm de Surville
 1808: The Reconciliation of Julie Condeille- Mme de Mersenne
 1809: The Knights of Industry by Alexandre-Vincent Pineux Duval- Mme Franval
 1810: Mother Confidante by Pierre de Marivaux- Mme Argante

References 

International Standard Name File
National Library of France
University Documentation System
Library of Congress
Worldcat
Charlotte Vanhove on the Archives du Spectacle.net
The Universal Pronouncing Dictionary of Biography and Mythology

External links

French stage actresses
1771 births
1860 deaths
Actresses from The Hague
18th-century French actresses
19th-century French actresses